Kohei Mihara may refer to:

 Kohei Mihara (DJ), Japanese DJ and musician
, Japanese football player